The Rio Roosevelt State Forest was a state forest in the state of Rondônia, Brazil.

Location

The Rio Roosevelt State Forest was in the municipality of Pimenta Bueno, Rondônia.
The forest was on the western edge of the Aripuanã River basin.
It was bounded by the Roosevelt Indigenous Territory to the north and the Roosevelt River to the east. 
The Parque Indígena do Aripuanã lay on the opposite side of the Roosevelt River.
The forest was to be in the proposed South Amazon Ecotones Ecological Corridor.
An Imazon study showed that as of 2005 the forest had lost 52% of its original vegetation.
Another study showed 53% had been deforested as of July 2007.

History

On 31 May 2010 João Aparecido Cahulla, governor of the state, asked the legislative assembly to approve cancellation of the decree that created the forest based on recommendations of a study by a team of technicians.
The request was approved on 13 July 2010, one of six conservation units cancelled at a special session of the assembly.
The others were the Laranjeiras State Forest, Candeias State Park, Serra dos Parecis State Park, Rio Mequéns State Forest and Rio São Domingos State Forest.
Final cancellation was by law 584 of 19 July 2010.

Notes

Sources

State forests of Brazil
Protected areas of Rondônia
1990 establishments in Brazil